Kostka may refer to:

People 
Kostka family, Polish noble family (szlachta) from Kashubia
Aleksander Kostka Napierski (1620–1651), Polish captain during the Thirty Years' War in Swedish service
Anna Kostka (1575–1635), Polish–Lithuanian noble lady
Carl Kostka (1846–1921), German mathematician, introduced Kostka numbers in 1882
Hubert Kostka (born 1940), Polish football player and manager
Jan Kostka (1529–1581), Polish noble and a candidate in elections for the new King of Poland in 1572
Katarzyna Kostka (1576–1648), Polish–Lithuanian noble lady
Michael Kostka (born 1985), professional ice hockey defenceman
Petr Kostka (born 1938), Czech actor
Stan Kostka (1913–1997), American football fullback in the National Football League (NFL) and later a college football coach
Stanisław Kostka (1475–1555) (1475–1555), Polish noble, adviser to King Sigismund I the Old and King Sigismund II Augustus I
Stanisław Kostka Gadomski (1718–1797), governor of Łęczyca province from 1787, Speaker of the Sejm, General officer of Armed forces
Stanisław Kostka Potocki (1755–1821), Polish noble, politician, writer, publicist, collector and patron of art
Stanisław Kostka Zamoyski (1775–1856), Polish nobleman (szlachcic), politician, landowner, patron of arts
Stanislaus Kostka S.J. (1550–1568), Polish novice of the Society of Jesus
Stefan Kostka (born 1939), American music theorist
Tomáš Kostka (born 1984), Czech racing driver living in France
Vladimír Kostka (1922–2009), Czech ice hockey coach

Places 
Mount Kostka, Antarctica

In mathematics 
Kostka number K, introduced by Carl Kostka in 1882, non-negative integer depending on two partitions λ and μ, that is equal to the number of semistandard Young tableaux of shape λ and weight μ
Kostka polynomial or Kostka–Foulkes polynomial K(q, t), named after Carl Kostka, polynomial in two variables with non-negative integer coefficients depending on two partitions λ and μ

See also
Kostka-Napierski uprising, peasant revolt in Poland in 1651
Saint-Stanislas-de-Kostka, Quebec, municipality of Quebec, Canada
St. Stanislaus Kostka Church (disambiguation)

Czech-language surnames
Polish-language surnames